Leave Me Alone is the debut full-length studio album by Spanish garage rock band Hinds. It was released on 8 January 2016 under Lucky Number and Mom + Pop Music. The album follows several singles and a 10"-compilation the band released between 2014 and 2016 as a duo and since adding drummer Amber Grimbergen and bassist Ade Martín as a quartet. "Garden" "San Diego", "Easy" and "Warts" were released as singles and music videos.

In October 2016 a deluxe edition of Leave Me Alone was released, featuring a bonus disc of B-sides, rarities and cell phone demos that were mostly recorded prior to the album's recording. An animated music video for "Bamboo" was released to promote the deluxe edition.

Music and lyrics 
Leave Me Alone has been described as a set of cheerful, casual, lo-fi, guitar-driven pop songs, with many critics referring to the music as "surf-rock". Most songs feature duets by the band's two vocalists, Ana Perrote and Carlotta Cosials. The songs are sung in English, and thematically cover positive and negative romantic situations, among other subjects.

Reception 

Leave Me Alone received mostly positive reviews upon its release, largely describing the album as playful, energetic, and exuberant, although some critics identified a more serious and gloomy side to the music. Though drawing comparisons to many other similarly unpolished garage rock bands, critics praised the album's distinctive success at conveying the band's camaraderie and their enthusiasm for their music. Noel Gardner of NME commented on "the impression [the album] gives of Hinds as a tight-knit girl gang," and Spin's Harley Brown wrote that the band often sounds like "they got carried away with the sheer good fortune of discovering their musical talent -- and how much fun it is playing with each other."

The dual vocalists were identified as one of the best aspects of the album, with Quinn Moreland of Pitchfork writing that "the best moments on Leave Me Alone occur when Cosials and Perrote are going all-out, belting together without restraint."

The album has also been negatively criticized for not expanding creatively beyond other bands in the genre, with Spin's Gardner writing that "it's a little hard to avoid feeling like you've heard this one before." Ken Capobianco of The Boston Globe criticized the predictability of the songs, saying that he hopes the band's songwriting improves in the future, and that "too many songs... seem like first drafts."

Track listing

Personnel 
Credits for Leave Me Alone adapted from album liner notes.

Hinds
 Carlotta Cosials – vocals, guitar
 Amber Grimbergen – drums
 Ade Martín – bass guitar
 Ana García Perrote – vocals, guitar

Additional personnel
 Miqui Brightside – photography
 Diego García – mixing, production
 Paco Loco – mixing
 Ashley Standford – photography

Charts

References 

2016 debut albums
Hinds (band) albums
Mom + Pop Music albums